Newport, New Jersey may refer to:
Newport, Cumberland County, New Jersey
Newport, Hunterdon County, New Jersey
Newport, Jersey City, New Jersey